Czech Lion Award for Best Editing is award given to the Czech film with best Editing.

Winners

External links

Film editing awards
Czech Lion Awards
Awards established in 1993